Perry Township may refer to:

Canada 
 Perry, Ontario

United States

Arkansas 
 Perry Township, Johnson County, Arkansas, in Johnson County, Arkansas
 Perry Township, Perry County, Arkansas, in Perry County, Arkansas

Illinois 
 Perry Township, Pike County, Illinois

Indiana 
 Perry Township, Allen County, Indiana
 Perry Township, Boone County, Indiana
 Perry Township, Clay County, Indiana
 Perry Township, Clinton County, Indiana
 Perry Township, Delaware County, Indiana
 Perry Township, Lawrence County, Indiana
 Perry Township, Marion County, Indiana
 Perry Township, Martin County, Indiana
 Perry Township, Miami County, Indiana
 Perry Township, Monroe County, Indiana
 Perry Township, Noble County, Indiana
 Perry Township, Tippecanoe County, Indiana
 Perry Township, Vanderburgh County, Indiana
 Perry Township, Wayne County, Indiana

Iowa 
 Perry Township, Buchanan County, Iowa
 Perry Township, Davis County, Iowa
 Perry Township, Jackson County, Iowa
 Perry Township, Plymouth County, Iowa
 Perry Township, Tama County, Iowa

Kansas 
 Perry Township, Woodson County, Kansas, in Woodson County, Kansas

Michigan 
 Perry Township, Michigan

Minnesota 
 Perry Township, Lac qui Parle County, Minnesota

Missouri 
 Perry Township, St. Francois County, Missouri

Nebraska 
 Perry Township, Thurston County, Nebraska

North Dakota 
 Perry Township, Cavalier County, North Dakota, in Cavalier County, North Dakota

Ohio 
 Perry Township, Allen County, Ohio
 Perry Township, Ashland County, Ohio
 Perry Township, Brown County, Ohio
 Perry Township, Carroll County, Ohio
 Perry Township, Columbiana County, Ohio
 Perry Township, Coshocton County, Ohio
 Perry Township, Fayette County, Ohio
 Perry Township, Franklin County, Ohio
 Perry Township, Gallia County, Ohio
 Perry Township, Hocking County, Ohio
 Perry Township, Lake County, Ohio
 Perry Township, Lawrence County, Ohio
 Perry Township, Licking County, Ohio
 Perry Township, Logan County, Ohio
 Perry Township, Monroe County, Ohio
 Perry Township, Montgomery County, Ohio
 Perry Township, Morrow County, Ohio
 Perry Township, Muskingum County, Ohio
 Perry Township, Pickaway County, Ohio
 Perry Township, Pike County, Ohio
 Perry Township, Putnam County, Ohio
 Perry Township, Richland County, Ohio
 Perry Township, Shelby County, Ohio
 Perry Township, Stark County, Ohio
 Perry Township, Tuscarawas County, Ohio
 Perry Township, Wood County, Ohio

Pennsylvania 
 Perry Township, Armstrong County, Pennsylvania
 Perry Township, Berks County, Pennsylvania
 Perry Township, Clarion County, Pennsylvania
 Perry Township, Fayette County, Pennsylvania
 Perry Township, Greene County, Pennsylvania
 Perry Township, Jefferson County, Pennsylvania
 Perry Township, Lawrence County, Pennsylvania
 Perry Township, Mercer County, Pennsylvania
 Perry Township, Snyder County, Pennsylvania

South Dakota 
 Perry Township, Davison County, South Dakota, in Davison County, South Dakota
 Perry Township, Lincoln County, South Dakota, in Lincoln County, South Dakota

Township name disambiguation pages